The 2008 Strauss Canada Cup was held February 27 to March 2 at the Interior Savings Centre in Kamloops, British Columbia. The men's champion was Kevin Koe and the women's champion was Stefanie Lawton.

Men's

Teams
 Glenn Howard (2007 Tim Hortons Brier winner)
 Randy Ferbey (2007 Canada Cup of Curling winner)
 Kevin Martin (2007 Players' Championships winner)
 Kevin Koe (JSI Qualifier)
 Mike McEwen (JSI Qualifier)
 Russ Howard (JSI Qualifier) (dropped out)
 Kerry Burtnyk (JSI Qualifier)
 Jeff Stoughton (4th, CCA rankings as of Dec. 18, 2007)
 Pat Simmons (7th, CCA rankings as of Dec. 18, 2007)
 Brad Gushue (8th, CCA rankings as of Dec. 18, 2007)
 Reid Carruthers (invited as replacement), with  Charley Thomas as replacement skip

Standings

Group A

Group B

Tie-breakers
Tie-Breaker #1: Martin 8-7 Stoughton
Tie-Breaker #1: Simmons 8-6 McEwen
Tie-Breaker #2: Martin 10-2 Simmons

Playoffs

Women's

Teams
 Kelly Scott (2007 Scotties Tournament of Hearts winner)
 Jennifer Jones (2007 Canada Cup of Curling and Player's Championships winner)
 Cheryl Bernard (Diversified Qualifier)
 Sherry Middaugh (Diversified Qualifier) (dropped out)
 Stefanie Lawton (Diversified Qualifier)
 Janet Harvey (Diversified Qualifier)
 Shannon Kleibrink (1st, CCA rankings as of Dec. 18, 2007)
 Cathy King (7th, CCA rankings as of Dec. 18, 2007)
 Sherry Anderson (8th, CCA rankings as of Dec. 18, 2007)
 Michelle Englot (9th, CCA rankings as of Dec. 18, 2007)  (dropped out)
 Kristie Moore (invited as replacement)
 Heather Rankin (invited as replacement)

*Karla Sparks temporarily replaced Schraeder and played lead, with Carter and Simons moving up their positions.

Standings

Group A

Group B

Playoffs

Qualifying
The Four qualifying positions in both the men's and women's events were held December 12–16, 2007. The men's qualifier was held at the Ottawa Curling Club and Rideau Curling Club in Ottawa while the women's qualifier was held at the Saville Sports Centre in Edmonton.

John Shea Insurance Canada Cup Qualifier (Men)

Teams:
 Shawn Adams
 Chad Allen
 Kerry Burtnyk
 Ted Butler
 Reid Carruthers
 Peter Corner
 Robert Desjardins
 Martin Ferland
 Dwayne Fowler
 Joe Frans
 Francois Gagné
 Sean Geall
 James Grattan
 Brad Gushue
 Brad Heidt
 Guy Hemmings
 Dean Horning
 Russ Howard
 Dean Joanisse
 Mark Johnson
 Joel Jordison
 Shawn Joyce
 Mark Kehoe
 Jamie King
  James Krikness
 Kevin Koe
 Cary Luner
 Allan Lyburn
 Brent MacDonald
 Heath McCormick
 Jeff McCrady
 Mike McEwen
 Jean-Michel Ménard
 John Morris (already qualified as part of team Kevin Martin)
 Darren Moulding
 Shane Park
 Dan Petryk
 Tim Phillips
 Howard Rajala
 Serge Reid
 Greg Richardson
 Nick Rizzo
 Pat Simmons
 Don Spriggs
 Jeff Stoughton
 Jim Sullivan

Diversified Transportation Canada Cup Qualifier (Women)

Teams:
 Sherry Anderson
 Jerri-Pat Armstrong
 Ève Bélisle
 Cheryl Bernard
 Chelsea Carey
 Joanne Delanoy
 Chantelle Eberle
 Michelle Englot
 Kerry Galusha
 Suzanne Gaudet
 Alison Goring
 Jenn Hanna
 Meredith Harrison
 Janet Harvey
 Amber Holland
 Rachel Homan
 Kristy Jenion
 Lisa Johnson
 Colleen Jones
 Andrea Kelly
 Cathy King
 Shannon Kleibrink
 Patti Knezevic
 Stefanie Lawton
 Carrie Lindner
 Allison MacInnes
 Colleen Madonia
 Chana Martineau 
 Krista McCarville
 Jolene McIvor
 Sherry Middaugh
 Kristie Moore
 Karen Porritt 
 Karen Powell
 Heather Rankin
 Kristen Recksiedler
 Julie Reddick
 Darcy Robertson
 Deb Santos
 Renée Sonnenberg
 Barb Spencer
 Keliegh Strath
 Shauna Streich
 Heather Strong
 Crystal Webster
 Faye White

External links

References

Canada Cup Of Curling, 2008
Canada Cup (curling)
Sport in Kamloops
Curling competitions in British Columbia
2008 in British Columbia
February 2008 sports events in Canada
March 2008 sports events in Canada